The Kallada Jalotsavam (കല്ലട ജലോത്സവം)is a popular Vallam Kali (boat race) held on the Kallada River at Munroe Thuruthu on 28 days after Onam (28 aam Onam) in Indian state of Kerala.
The boat race is conducted along the straight portion (nettayam) of Kallada River. Famous achievers in various fields are honoured during the event.

The boat race can be conveniently viewed from Munroe Island (Munroethuruthu in vernacular). Munroe Island holds an important place in the tourist map of Kerala. The country boat sightseeing across Munroe Island conducted by the Kollam district tourist promotion council is the best of its kind in the country. Munroe Island can be reached from Kollam railway station by road (28 km). 12 km from Kundara & 24 km from Karunagapally at North. Kollam is 71 km away by road from the Trivandrum airport.

The competitions will be preceded by a colourful sail-past and mass drill by the boats competing in the race.

About the event
The boat race is an annual event which happens 28 days after Onam (28 aam Onam).

Boats
12 Snake boats including 5 Iruttukuthi A grade boats and vepp a b boats will participate.

Trophies and prize money
The winners will be awarded Kallada rolling trophy and 100,000, 50,000, 25,000 and 15,000 respectively as first to fourth places, and 50,000 will be given to each team as bonus.

Winners

Other renowned boat races in Kerala
 President's Trophy Boat Race
 Nehru Trophy Boat Race
 Champakulam Moolam Boat Race
 Aranmula Uthrattadi Vallamkali
 Payippad Jalotsavam
 Kumarakom Boat Race
 Indira Gandhi Boat Race
 Gothuruth Boat Race since 1938, Ernakullam www.gothuruthboatrace.com

External links
 https://web.archive.org/web/20110814201340/http://kollamcity.in/kallada-boat-race
 
 https://web.archive.org/web/20110814201340/http://kollamcity.in/kallada-boat-race
 http://www.treklens.com/gallery/Asia/India/photo531352.htm
 https://www.youtube.com/watch?v=bnZkH5Brohk
 http://www.keralawebsite.com/video/video.php?vid=103&cat_id=4
 http://week.manoramaonline.com/cgi-bin/MMOnline.DLL/portal/ep/common/pictureGalleryPopup.jsp?picGallery=%2FMM+Photo+Galleries%2FFestival%2FKallada+Boat+Race&BV_ID=@@@

References

Boat races in Kerala
Paddling
Festivals in Kollam district